An onavillu is a simple, short, bow-shaped musical instrument. Its name may come from Onam, a festival in Kerala where the instrument is used in dances, and villu, which means 'bow' in Malayalam (and several other South Indian languages). Although still regularly used in rural art forms, use of the onavillu is on the decline.

Onavillu also refers to flat, tapered wooden artifacts decorated with tassels and used in ceremonies of devotion to Lord Vishnu.

Instrument

The onavillu that accompanies the Kummattikali and other folk dances is a Keralite string instrument made from the pith of the palmyra stem, or from bamboo, shaped as a bow.  Bamboo slivers are used for bowstrings. The bow strings sound when struck with a thin stick, the size of a pencil. The sound can be varied through finger pressure on the string.

Ceremonial bow
The ceremonial onavillu, which is not a musical instrument, is made from a flat piece of wood 1/2 inch thick, tapering on both sides. Sizes range from 3.5 feet by 4 inches to 4.5 feet by 6 inches. The wood of kadambu, maruthu, jack fruit, and aanjili trees are preferred (See List of Indian timber trees). The wood is cut to the required dimension before being decorated with miniature paintings of Anantha Sayanam (reclining pose of Lord Vishnu) and avatars Dasavatharam, Shri Rama Pattabhishekam and Shri Krishna Leela. Ashari family residing near Pujapura Trivandrum are the right to make the red tassels used to adorn the bows.

The making of the ceremonial bows is the preserve of a local family.

Legend
According to legend, when King Mahabali was being pushed into the earth by Vamana, Lord Vishnu appeared before him. King Mahabali asked that each year he could be allowed to visit his native land and to see the Lord Vishnu. Lord Vishnu granted him the boon, but said that the King would be able to see him and his avatars only as painted images. Lord Vishvakarman was ordered to paint images of Dasavatharam on pieces of kadambu wood. This was the origin of the onavillu, which is put on display every year for King Mahabali to see.

Ceremonial use
On Thiruvonam day, the birthday of Lord Maha Vishnu, large number of devotees visit the Sri Padmanabha Swamy temple in Thiruvananthapuram, Kerala, India to take part in the onavillu charthal, the dedication ceremony of the colourful bows. The temple is one of the 108 sacred temples dedicated to Lord Mahavishnu.  The bows are first offered to the family deity at the Vilayil Veedu, Karamana for three days. They are then taken to Sri Padmanabha Swamy temple on Thiru Onam day and displayed at the Natakasala before being offered to the deity.

The Anantha Sayanam version of the villu is consecrated to Lord Padmanabha (Vishnu); the one with the Dasavathram painting is offered to Lord Narasimha; the one showing the Krishna-leela is dedicated to Lord Krishna; the one with the painting of Shri Rama Pattabhishekam is consecrated to the idol of Shri Rama.

The onavillu are removed on the third day. The Temple Trust distributes and sells the onavillu to devotees, who consider them a symbol of prosperity.

References

Indian musical instruments
Musical bows
Ceremonial weapons